Rapti River may refer to one of two rivers in Nepal and India:
 East Rapti River
 West Rapti River